Freziera euryoides is a species of plant in the Pentaphylacaceae family. It is endemic to Colombia.

References

euryoides
Endemic flora of Colombia
Critically endangered plants
Taxonomy articles created by Polbot